The 1997 VMI Keydets football team was an American football team that represented the Virginia Military Institute (VMI) as a member of the Southern Conference (SoCon) during the 1997 NCAA Division I-AA football season. In first third year under head coach Ted Cain, the team compiled an overall record of 0–11, with a mark of 0–8 in conference play, placing last in the SoCon. In January 1997 Cain was introduced as the 27th all-time head coach of the Keydets after serving as offensive coordinator at NC State.

Schedule

References

VMI
VMI Keydets football seasons
College football winless seasons
VMI Keydets football